Good King Dagobert (French title: Le Bon Roi Dagobert; in Italian: Dagobert) is a 1984 French-Italian film directed by Dino Risi.

Plot
The film is inspired by a popular song against the French monarchy, created during the French Revolution. The song was about how the king was unable to do anything without his royal advisor Eloy.

During the 7th century, the lazy and messy King Dagobert I goes to Rome to ask Pope Honorius I for forgiveness of his sins of revelry and fornication. But Dagobert does not know that the pope, while he was traveling, was replaced in a conspiracy by a doppelganger. The replacement is a crude and rude man, even more stupid than Dagobert.

Cast
 Coluche - Dagobert I
 Michel Serrault - Otarius
 Ugo Tognazzi - Pope Honorius and his look-alike
 Carole Bouquet - Héméré
 Isabella Ferrari - Chrodilde
 Michael Lonsdale - Saint Eligius
 Venantino Venantini - Demetrius, merchant
 Karin Mai - Nanthild, the Queen
 Francesco Scali - Landek
 Antonio Vezza - Rutilius
 Sabrina Siani - Berthilde
 Marcello Bonini Olas - Heraclius, the Emperor of Byzance
 Isabella Dandolo - Alpaide
 Federica Paccosi - Ragnetrude
 Gea Martire - Philliria

References

External links
 

French biographical films
1984 films
Films directed by Dino Risi
Films set in the 7th century
Italian biographical films
Films scored by Guido & Maurizio De Angelis
Gaumont Film Company films
1980s French films
1980s Italian films